Christian Sund (born 24 December 1978) is a Finnish football coach and a former player. He is the manager of KPV.

Coaching career
After retiring, Sund worked as a youth coach for Vasa IFK and later SJK. In 2018, he took charge of VPS's B-team and later became assistant manager of the first team in the beginning of 2019. In the summer 2019, he was appointed manager of the club.

On 17 November 2021, he signed a two-year contract as the head coach of KPV, beginning in the 2022 season.

References

External links
Guardian Football
Veikkausliiga Hall of Fame

1978 births
Living people
Finnish footballers
Finnish football managers
Östers IF players
Helsingin Jalkapalloklubi players
FC Lahti players
Stabæk Fotball players
JJK Jyväskylä players
Seinäjoen Jalkapallokerho players
Veikkausliiga players
Eliteserien players
Finnish expatriate footballers
Expatriate footballers in Sweden
Finnish expatriate sportspeople in Sweden
Expatriate footballers in Norway
Finnish expatriate sportspeople in Norway
Association football midfielders
Vaasan Palloseura managers
Sportspeople from Vaasa